Derby (formerly known as Milo Junction) is the name of railroad repair facilities in Milo, Maine. In 1905, it was described by the Bangor Daily Commercial as being the second-largest repair shops in New England, as built by the Bangor & Aroostook Railroad.

References

Industrial buildings and structures in Maine
Railway buildings and structures in Maine
Railway workshops in the United States